The Melting Pot is a graphic novel by Kevin Eastman, Simon Bisley and Eric Talbot. Eastman and Talbot collaborated on the story, while Eastman and Bisley worked together on the painted artwork.

The series spent several years in development, with advertisements promoting its release appearing in Mirage Studios books from as far back as 1989. It was eventually serialized in four issues released in 1993 and 1994 by Kitchen Sink Press. A 144-page paperback volume collecting the series with a foreword by Mike Allred followed in 1995.

In November 2007, Eastman published a new 170-page version of the story, filling an entire issue of Heavy Metal magazine. The 2007 version is substantially different from the original series, with an expanded, more coherent narrative and new artwork by Eastman, Bisley, and Rob Prior.

Adaptations
Key characters and other elements of the Melting Pot story became the basis for the direct-to-video animated film Heavy Metal 2000 in 2000.

Publication

See also
 1995 in comics

References

Kitchen Sink Press titles
1993 comics debuts
1994 comics endings
1995 graphic novels
Comics adapted into video games
Comics adapted into animated films